Llanddewi Brefi is a village, parish and community of approximately 500 people in Ceredigion, Wales.

In the sixth century, Saint David (in Welsh, Dewi Sant), the patron saint of Wales, held the Synod of Brefi here and it has borne his name since; "Llan" referring in Welsh place names to a church or holy place. Llanddewi Brefi (Welsh, meaning "Church of David on the [River] Brefi", the Brefi being a tributary of the River Teifi).

History and description

The grade II* listed parish church of St David dates from the 12th century, on a site associated with religious worship since the 7th century. Fragments of much older buildings are incorporated into the Norman church. The church contains a modern statue of Saint David and a collection of Celtic crosses.  When the Synod of Brefi was held in the village in the sixth century, it is said that the small hill upon which the church stands marks the spot where the ground was miraculously raised up under St David so that he could be heard better at this synod.

In addition to the Anglican church, there is a non-conformist chapel, two pubs and one village shop.  The village and the surrounding area are largely Welsh-speaking and the local economy is dominated by sheep and dairy farming.

Pont Gogoyan is a bridge over the River Teifi,  to the south-west of the village and within the parish. The bridge has five stone arches and was built in the 18th century. It is a Grade II* listed structure.

In 1977 the village was the scene of one of the world's biggest ever raids involving the drug LSD. Over 6 million tabs of the drug were seized as part of Operation Julie on 26 March of that year.

The village is the home of the character  in the television comedy series Little Britain. The popularity of the show led to tourists visiting to be photographed next to the village's road signs; several of the signs were stolen and listed for sale in 2005.

Notable people 
 Robert Daniell (1646-1718), governor of the Province of South Carolina
 Sir David Davies (1792-1865), physician to King William IV and Queen Adelaide.
 John D. Davies (1795–1861), priest, honorary canon of Durham Cathedral from 1853
 Evan Evans (1804–1886), a dissenting minister, known as Evans bach Nantyglo.
 D. Ben Rees (born 1937), publisher, author, lecturer and minister in the Presbyterian Church of Wales

References

External links

www.geograph.co.uk : photos of Llanddewi Brefi and surrounding area

Villages in Ceredigion
Communities in Ceredigion